Lachlan Hosie (born 25 February 1997) is an Australian rules footballer who played for the North Melbourne Football Club in the Australian Football League (AFL). He was recruited by the North Melbourne Football Club with the 5th draft pick in the 2019 AFL Midseason Rookie Draft.

Early football 
Hosie played junior football for the Henley Football Club, where he kicked a total of 77 goals in his 2014 season in the Under 18s. Before his selection at the midseason draft, Hosie was leading the goalkicking count in the 2019 SANFL season.

AFL career
Hosie kicked 20 goals in 10 games for 's reserves team, but struggled to break into the team. On debut, he kicked two goals in the opening quarter. He also picked up 9 disposals, 2 tackles and a mark throughout the rest of the game. Hosie then returned to Adelaide to again play for Glenelg. He was selected to represent South Australia against Western Australia in their interstate match in 2021.

Statistics
Statistics are correct to the 2020 season

|- style="background:#EAEAEA"
| scope="row" text-align:center | 2020
| 
| 46 || 5 || 3 || 1 || 24 || 15 || 39 || 12 || 34|| 0.6 || 0.2 || 4.8 || 3.0 || 7.8 || 2.4 || 0.8
|- style="background:#EAEAEA; font-weight:bold; width:2em"
| scope="row" text-align:center class="sortbottom" colspan=3 | Career
| 5
| 3
| 1
| 24
| 15
| 39
| 12
| 34
| 0.6
| 0.2
| 4.8
| 3.0
| 7.8
| 2.4
| 0.8
|}

References

External links

1997 births
Living people
North Melbourne Football Club players
Australian rules footballers from South Australia
Glenelg Football Club players